Daniel Alejandro Farías Acosta (born 28 September 1981) is a Venezuelan football manager and former player who played as a goalkeeper. He is the current manager of Uruguayan club Boston River.

Career
Born in Cumaná, Farías represented hometown club Nueva Cádiz FC as a player, and remained with the club until 2001, when it moved to Maracaibo and changed name to Zulianos FC. He subsequently retired and started studying for a law degree.

After the arrival of his brother César as Deportivo Anzoátegui manager, Farías was named goalkeeping coach at the same club. After César's departure, he was named Marcos Mathías's assistant.

On 12 March 2009, Farías was appointed manager of Anzoátegui. He left the club on 12 December 2012, after winning that year's Copa Venezuela, and was named at the helm of Deportivo Táchira the following day.

After leaving the club in December 2015, Farías was an assistant of his brother César at Cerro Porteño and The Strongest before being appointed manager of Zulia FC on 12 January 2017. On 14 August, he took over The Strongest, but left on 19 December.

On 23 April 2018, Farías was named Deportivo La Guaira manager. On 5 June, after already being an assistant, he was invited by Bolivia to take charge of the team in friendlies against South Korea and Serbia, as his brother César was not available.

On 9 November 2022, Farías left La Guaira to take over Boston River of the Uruguayan Primera División.

Honours

Player
Nueva Cádiz
Venezuelan Segunda División: 1997–98

Manager
Deportivo Anzoátegui
Copa de Venezuela: 2012

Deportivo Táchira
Venezuelan Primera División: 2014–15

References

External links
 

1975 births
Living people
People from Cumaná
Venezuelan footballers
Association football goalkeepers
Venezuelan football managers
Deportivo Anzoátegui managers
Deportivo Táchira F.C. managers
The Strongest managers
Deportivo La Guaira managers
Bolivia national football team managers
Boston River managers
Venezuelan expatriate sportspeople in Paraguay
Expatriate football managers in Bolivia
20th-century Venezuelan people
21st-century Venezuelan people
Zulia F.C. managers